Andres is an Unincorporated Community in Will County, Illinois, United States. It is located south of Frankfort and west of Peotone on U.S. Route 45.

Community information
Andres has a population of less than 50 people. There is no library or any city services. It has many older buildings. There are no city streets. There also used to be a railroad that came through.

School
Andres is part of Peotone Community School District 207-U.

Geography
Andres is surrounded by farms.

Demographics

Business
Businesses in town include Andres & Wilton Farmers Grain Elevator along with a very small car dealership. Besides buying and selling grain, the elevator sells livestock feed, straw, wood shavings, and plastic drainage tile. In October 2006, a strong windstorm demolished a large steel grain bin at the elevator.

References

Unincorporated communities in Will County, Illinois
Unincorporated communities in Illinois